This article provides details of international football games played by the Bangladesh women's national football team from 2010 to 2019.

Results

2019

2018

2017

2016

2014

2013

2012

2011

2010

References

Bangladesh women's national football team results
2010s in Bangladeshi sport